Kyle Edward Bradish (born September 12, 1996) is an American professional baseball pitcher for the Baltimore Orioles of Major League Baseball (MLB). He made his MLB debut in 2022.

Amateur career
Bradish attended Millennium High School in Goodyear, Arizona. In 2015, his senior year, he batted .308 while striking out 78 batters over  innings. He was not selected in the 2015 Major League Baseball draft and enrolled at New Mexico State University where he played college baseball.

As a freshman at New Mexico State in 2016, Bradish appeared in 17 games (15 starts) in which he compiled an 8–3 record with a 4.67 ERA, striking out a team-high 82 batters over  innings. In 2017, his sophomore season, he went 8–2 with a 3.20 ERA over 15 games (14 starts), and was named to the Western Athletic Conference First-Team. That summer, he played for the Falmouth Commodores of the Cape Cod Baseball League, and was named an All-Star. As a junior in 2018, he went 9–3 with a 2.67 ERA over 17 starts, and was named to the All-WAC Team for the second straight season.

Professional career

Los Angeles Angels
After his junior year at New Mexico State, Bradish was selected by the Los Angeles Angels in the fourth round of the 2018 Major League Baseball draft. He signed and made his professional debut in 2019 with the Inland Empire 66ers of the Class A-Advanced California League, going 6–7 with a 4.28 ERA over 24 games (18 starts), earning All-Star honors.

Baltimore Orioles
On December 4, 2019, Bradish (alongside Zach Peek, Isaac Mattson, and Kyle Brnovich) was traded to the Baltimore Orioles in exchange for Dylan Bundy. Bradish did not play a minor league game in 2020 due to the cancellation of the minor league season caused by the COVID-19 pandemic. To begin the 2021 season, he was assigned to the Bowie Baysox of the Double-A Northeast. After three starts and  scoreless innings, he was promoted to the Norfolk Tides of the Triple-A East. Over 21 games (19 starts) with Norfolk, Bradish went 5–5 with a 4.26 ERA and 105 strikeouts over  innings.

On November 19, 2021, the Orioles selected Bradish's contract and added him to their 40-man roster. He returned to Norfolk to open the 2022 season. On April 29, 2022, the Orioles promoted Bradish to the majors to make his MLB debut that night as the starting pitcher versus the Boston Red Sox. Bradish allowed two earned runs over six innings pitched while striking out two batters and walking one in his debut. On May 10, Bradish earned his first career win against the St. Louis Cardinals, at one point retiring 11 consecutive batters.

On September 22, 2022, Bradish allowed just two hits to the Houston Astros over  innings to lead an Orioles' shutout of the Astros, 2–0. He struck out ten in the longest outing to-date of his professional career. He finished the 2022 season with a 4–7 record and a 4.90 ERA which was 3.28 after the All-Star break.

References

External links

1996 births
Living people
People from Peoria, Arizona
Baseball players from Arizona
Major League Baseball pitchers
Baltimore Orioles players
New Mexico State Aggies baseball players
Falmouth Commodores players
Inland Empire 66ers of San Bernardino players
Bowie Baysox players
Norfolk Tides players